Kurinjipadi taluk is a taluk of Cuddalore district of the Indian state of Tamil Nadu. The headquarters of the taluk is the town of Kurinjipadi.
Abiyam pettai is the biggest village in this taluk

Population 
According to the 2011 census, the taluk of Kurinjipadi had a population of 331,299 with 167,444 males and 163,855 females. There were 978 women for every 1000 men. The taluk had a literacy rate of 74.10

References 

Taluks of Cuddalore district